Lewis Farms or Lewis Estates is a residential area in the west portion of the City of Edmonton in Alberta, Canada. It was established in 1988 through Edmonton City Council's adoption of the Lewis Farms Area Structure Plan, which guides the overall development of the area.

The community is represented by the Lewis Estates Community League, established in 1993.

Geography 
Located in west Edmonton, the Lewis Farms area is bounded by 231 Street to the west, Whitemud Drive to the south, Anthony Henday Drive (Highway 216) to the east, and Stony Plain Road (Highway 16A) to the north. The area is bisected by 215 Street (Winterburn Road) and Webber Greens Drive (87 Avenue).

Parkland County is located beyond 231 Street to the west, while the Enoch Cree Indian Reserve (Enoch Cree Nation) and The Grange are beyond Whitemud Drive to the south. The West Jasper Place area is across Anthony Henday Drive to the east and Winterburn Industrial is across Stony Plain Road to the north.

Neighbourhoods 
The Lewis Farms Area Structure Plan originally planned for eight separate neighbourhoods. Today, the Lewis Farms area includes the following:
Breckenridge Greens;
Lewis Farms Industrial, which includes the Normandeau Gardens rural residential subdivision;
Potter Greens;
Rosenthal;
Secord;
Stewart Greens;
Suder Greens;
Webber Greens.

Land use plans 
In addition to the Lewis Farms Area Structure Plan, the following plans were adopted to further guide development of certain portions of the Lewis Farms area:
the Breckenridge Greens Neighbourhood Structure Plan (NSP) in 1991, which applies to the Breckenridge Greens neighbourhood;
the Potter Greens NSP in 1990, which applies to the Potter Greens neighbourhood;
the Rosenthal NSP in 2009, which applies to the Rosenthal neighbourhood;
the Secord NSP in 2007, which applies to the Secord neighbourhood;
the Stewart Greens NSP in 2007, which applies to the Stewart Greens neighbourhood;
the Suder Greens NSP in 2002, which applies to the Suder Greens neighbourhood; and
the Webber Greens NSP in 2000, which applies to the Webber Greens neighbourhood.

Lewis Farms Transit Centre 

The Lewis Farms Transit Centre, opened in May 2011, is located on 87 Avenue just off of Anthony Henday Drive. This transit centre has park & ride, a passenger drop off area, public washrooms, vending machines, a payphone and a large shelter.

Since April 28, 2019 Lewis Farms Transit Centre and South Campus/Fort Edmonton Park Transit Centre have been reconfigured as part of a "Drop-Off Zone Pilot Project". As a part of this pilot, all buses dropping off passengers will do so at one of two "drop-off zones", before proceeding to the route's designated "boarding bay" to pick up passengers. At Lewis Farms in particular, any buses that are considerably early will wait at a designated "layover area" after dropping off passengers at the drop off zone but before picking up new passengers at the boarding bay.
The following bus routes serve the transit centre:

Surrounding areas

See also 
 Edmonton Federation of Community Leagues
 Edmonton Transit Service

References 

Neighbourhoods in Edmonton
Edmonton Transit Service transit centres